"Yer So Sweet" is a single by Cold Cold Hearts, released in 1996 as their only 7" through Kill Rock Stars.

Track listing

 Yer So Sweet (Baby Donut)
 Broken Teeth
 Any Resemblance to Persons Living or Dead is Purely Coincidental

Notes

1997 singles
1995 songs
Song articles with missing songwriters